Aharon Yariv (20 December 1920 – 7 May 1994) was an Israeli politician and general.

Biography
Aharon ("Aharale") Rabinovich (later Yariv) was born in Moscow in the Russian Soviet Federative Socialist Republic. He immigrated to Mandatory Palestine at the age of 15 and studied at the Pardes Hanna Agricultural High School. He began his military service in the Haganah in 1938, and later served as an officer in the British Army during World War II.

Military and political career
Yariv served in the Israel Defense Forces as a field officer. Among his duties he commanded the Golani Brigade. Later he served as the Israeli military attaché to Washington. During 1953-1956 he was a member of the founding team and the first commander of the IDF Command and Staff College. From 1964 to 1972, he was head of Aman, the IDF's military intelligence. After the Munich Massacre in 1972, he became Prime Minister Golda Meir's advisor on counterterrorism and directed Operation Wrath of God. During the Yom Kippur War of 1973 he was appointed as a special assistant to the IDF chief of staff and at the end of the war led the Israeli military delegation at the Kilometer 101 ceasefire talks with Egypt's General Mohamed Abdel Ghani el-Gamasy which endeavoured to bring about a military disengagement treaty.

After leaving the army, he joined the Alignment political party. He was elected to the Knesset in the 1973 elections, and was appointed Transportation Minister, and then Information Minister. He resigned from the latter post in 1975, and then from the Knesset shortly before the 1977 elections. In March 1979 he concluded the PLO had failed to disrupt normal life, halt immigration or deter tourism.

In 1977 he founded the Center for Strategic Studies at Tel Aviv University (later renamed the Jaffee Center for Strategic Studies and now the Institute for National Security Studies), Israel’s leading national security think tank. He headed the Institute until his death in 1994.

Commemoration
Yitzhak Rabin, Prime Minister at the time of his death, gave the eulogy at his funeral in 1994.

The role of Yariv was played by Amos Lavi in Steven Spielberg's 2005 film Munich.

References

Oren, Michael B. Six Days of War: June 1967 and the Making of the Modern Middle East. New York: Oxford University Press, 2002. , 76 p.

External links

Eulogies from the Jafee Center for Strategic Studies

1920 births
1994 deaths
20th-century Israeli military personnel
Alignment (Israel) politicians
Burials at Kiryat Shaul Cemetery
Directors of the Military Intelligence Directorate (Israel)
Israeli generals
20th-century Israeli Jews
Jewish Israeli politicians
Jews in Mandatory Palestine
Members of the 8th Knesset (1974–1977)
Ministers of Transport of Israel
Politicians from Moscow
Russian Jews
Soviet emigrants to Mandatory Palestine